The following outline is provided as an overview of and topical guide to Portugal:

The Portuguese Republic, commonly known as Portugal, is a sovereign country principally located on the Iberian Peninsula in Southern Europe.  Portugal is the westernmost country of continental Europe and is bordered by the Atlantic Ocean to the west and south and by Spain to the north and east. The Atlantic archipelagos of the Azores and Madeira (including the Savage Islands) are also part of Portugal.

The land within the borders of today's Portuguese Republic has been continuously settled since prehistoric times. Some of the earliest civilizations include Lusitanians and Celtic societies. Incorporation into the Roman Republic dominions took place in the 2nd century BC. The region was ruled and colonized by Germanic peoples, such as the Suebi and the Visigoths, from the 5th to the 8th century. From this era, some vestiges of the Alans were also found. The Muslim Moors arrived in the early 8th century and conquered the Christian Germanic kingdoms, eventually occupying most of the Iberian Peninsula. In the early 12th century, during the Christian Reconquista, Portugal appeared as a kingdom independent of its neighbour, the Kingdom of León and Galicia. In a little over a century, in 1249, Portugal would establish almost its entire modern-day borders.

During the 15th and 16th centuries, with a global empire that included possessions in Africa, Asia and South America, Portugal was one of the world's major economic, political, and cultural powers. In the 17th century, the Portuguese Restoration War between Portugal and Spain ended the sixty-year period of the Iberian Union (1580–1640). In the 19th century, armed conflict with French and Spanish invading forces and the loss of its largest territorial possession abroad, Brazil, disrupted political stability and potential economic growth. In 1910, the last Portuguese king was overthrown and a republic was proclaimed. In 1926, a coup d'état established a military dictatorship that would be replaced by a fascist regime called Estado Novo in 1933. After the Portuguese Colonial War (1961–1974) and the Carnation Revolution coup d'état in 1974, the ruling regime was deposed in Lisbon, a democracy was established and the country handed over its last overseas provinces in Africa. Portugal was accepted as a member of the European Economic Community in 1986. Portugal's last overseas territory, Macau, was handed over to China in 1999.

General reference 
 Common English country name:  Portugal
 Official English country name:  (The) Portuguese Republic
 Common endonym(s): Portugal
 Official endonym(s): República Portuguesa
 Adjectival(s): Portuguese
 Demonym(s): Portuguese
 Etymology: Name of Portugal
 International rankings of Portugal
 ISO country codes:  PT, PRT, 620
 ISO region codes:  See ISO 3166-2:PT
 Internet country code top-level domain:  .pt

Geography of Portugal 

Geography of Portugal
 Portugal is a:
 Country
 Developed country
 Nation state
 Sovereign state
 Member State of the European Union
 Location:
 Northern and Western Hemisphere
 Eurasia
 Europe
 Western and Southern Europe
 Iberian Peninsula
 Time zones:
 Azores – UTC-01, summer UTC+00
 Rest of Portugal – Western European Time (UTC+00), Western European Summer Time (UTC+01)
 Extreme points of Portugal
 High:  Ponta do Pico on Pico Island  - highest point in the Azores        Torre  - highest point in continental Portugal
 Low:  North Atlantic Ocean 0 m
 Land boundaries:   1,214 km
 Coastline:  North Atlantic Ocean 1,793 km
 Population of Portugal: 10,617,600 (January 1, 2008)  - 77th most populous country
 Area of Portugal: 92,345 km2
 Atlas of Portugal
 Islands of Portugal

Environment of Portugal 

 Climate of Portugal
 Ecoregions in Portugal
 Renewable energy in Portugal
 Geology of Portugal
 Protected areas of Portugal
 Biosphere reserves in Portugal
 National parks of Portugal
 Wildlife of Portugal
 Fauna of Portugal
 Birds of Portugal
 Mammals of Portugal

Natural geographic features of Portugal 
 Glaciers of Portugal
 Islands of Portugal
 Lakes of Portugal
 Mountains of Portugal
 Volcanoes in Portugal
 Rivers of Portugal
 Waterfalls of Portugal
 Valleys of Portugal
 World Heritage Sites in Portugal

Regions of Portugal 

Regions of Portugal

Ecoregions of Portugal 

List of ecoregions in Portugal
 Ecoregions in Portugal

Administrative divisions of Portugal 

Administrative divisions of Portugal
 Autonomous regions of Portugal
 Districts of Portugal
 Municipalities of Portugal
 Parishes of Portugal

Autonomous Regions of Portugal 

Autonomous regions of Portugal
 Azores
 Madeira

Districts of Portugal 

Districts of Portugal

Municipalities of Portugal 

Municipalities of Portugal

Parishes of Portugal 

Parishes of Portugal
 Capital of Portugal: Lisbon
 Cities of Portugal
 Towns of Portugal

Demography of Portugal 

Demographics of Portugal
Portuguese people

Government and politics of Portugal 

 Politics of Portugal
 Form of government: unitary semi-presidential representative democratic republic
 Capital of Portugal: Lisbon
 Elections in Portugal
 Political parties in Portugal

Branches of the government of Portugal 

 Government of Portugal

Executive branch of the government of Portugal 
 Head of state: President of Portugal, Marcelo Rebelo de Sousa
 Head of government: Prime Minister of Portugal, António Costa
 Cabinet of Portugal

Legislative branch of the government of Portugal 

 Parliament of Portugal: Assembly of the Republic (unicameral)

Judicial branch of the government of Portugal 

 Court system of Portugal
 Supreme Court of Portugal

Foreign relations of Portugal 

 Foreign relations of Portugal
 Diplomatic missions in Portugal
 Diplomatic missions of Portugal

International organization membership 
The Portuguese Republic is a member of:

African Development Bank Group (AfDB) (nonregional member)
Asian Development Bank (ADB) (nonregional member)
Australia Group
Bank for International Settlements (BIS)
Comunidade dos Países de Língua Portuguesa (CPLP)
Confederation of European Paper Industries (CEPI)
Council of Europe (CE)
Economic and Monetary Union (EMU)
Euro-Atlantic Partnership Council (EAPC)
European Bank for Reconstruction and Development (EBRD)
European Investment Bank (EIB)
European Organization for Nuclear Research (CERN)
European Space Agency (ESA)
European Union (EU)
Food and Agriculture Organization (FAO)
Inter-American Development Bank (IADB)
International Atomic Energy Agency (IAEA)
International Bank for Reconstruction and Development (IBRD)
International Chamber of Commerce (ICC)
International Civil Aviation Organization (ICAO)
International Criminal Court (ICCt)
International Criminal Police Organization (Interpol)
International Development Association (IDA)
International Energy Agency (IEA)
International Federation of Red Cross and Red Crescent Societies (IFRCS)
International Finance Corporation (IFC)
International Fund for Agricultural Development (IFAD)
International Hydrographic Organization (IHO)
International Labour Organization (ILO)
International Maritime Organization (IMO)
International Mobile Satellite Organization (IMSO)
International Monetary Fund (IMF)
International Olympic Committee (IOC)
International Organization for Migration (IOM)
International Organization for Standardization (ISO)
International Red Cross and Red Crescent Movement (ICRM)
International Telecommunication Union (ITU)

International Telecommunications Satellite Organization (ITSO)
International Trade Union Confederation (ITUC)
Inter-Parliamentary Union (IPU)
Latin American Integration Association (LAIA) (observer)
Multilateral Investment Guarantee Agency (MIGA)
Nonaligned Movement (NAM) (guest)
North Atlantic Treaty Organization (NATO)
Nuclear Energy Agency (NEA)
Nuclear Suppliers Group (NSG)
Organisation for Economic Co-operation and Development (OECD)
Organization for Security and Co-operation in Europe (OSCE)
Organisation for the Prohibition of Chemical Weapons (OPCW)
Organization of American States (OAS) (observer)
Permanent Court of Arbitration (PCA)
Schengen Convention
Southeast European Cooperative Initiative (SECI) (observer)
União Latina
United Nations (UN)
United Nations Conference on Trade and Development (UNCTAD)
United Nations Educational, Scientific, and Cultural Organization (UNESCO)
United Nations High Commissioner for Refugees (UNHCR)
United Nations Industrial Development Organization (UNIDO)
United Nations Integrated Mission in Timor-Leste (UNMIT)
United Nations Interim Force in Lebanon (UNIFIL)
United Nations Mission in the Central African Republic and Chad (MINURCAT)
Universal Postal Union (UPU)
Western European Union (WEU)
World Confederation of Labour (WCL)
World Customs Organization (WCO)
World Federation of Trade Unions (WFTU)
World Health Organization (WHO)
World Intellectual Property Organization (WIPO)
World Meteorological Organization (WMO)
World Tourism Organization (UNWTO)
World Trade Organization (WTO)
Zangger Committee (ZC)

Law and order in Portugal 

 Law of Portugal
 Cannabis in Portugal
 Capital punishment in Portugal
 Constitution of Portugal
 Crime in Portugal
 Human rights in Portugal
 LGBT rights in Portugal
 Freedom of religion in Portugal
 Law enforcement in Portugal

Military of Portugal 

 Military of Portugal
 Command
 Commander-in-chief:
 Ministry of Defence of Portugal
 Forces
 Army of Portugal
 Navy of Portugal
 Air Force of Portugal
 Special forces of Portugal
 Military history of Portugal
 Military ranks of Portugal

Local government in Portugal 

 Local government in Portugal

History of Portugal 

History of Portugal
Timeline of the history of Portugal
Current events of Portugal
 Economic history of Portugal
 Military history of Portugal

Culture of Portugal 

Culture of Portugal
 Architecture of Portugal
Baroque architecture in Portugal
Portuguese colonial architecture
Portuguese Gothic architecture
Portuguese Romanesque architecture
Rococo architecture in Portugal
 Cuisine of Portugal
 Festivals in Portugal
 Languages of Portugal
 Portuguese language
 Mirandese language
 Media in Portugal
 Museums in Portugal
 National symbols of Portugal
 Coat of arms of Portugal
 Flag of Portugal
 National anthem of Portugal
 People of Portugal
 Prostitution in Portugal
 Public holidays in Portugal
 Records of Portugal
 Religion in Portugal
 Christianity in Portugal
Roman Catholicism in Portugal
Protestantism in Portugal
 Hinduism in Portugal
 Islam in Portugal
 Judaism in Portugal
 World Heritage Sites in Portugal

Art in Portugal 
 Art in Portugal
 Cinema of Portugal
 Literature of Portugal
 Music of Portugal
 Television in Portugal
 Theatre in Portugal

Sports in Portugal 

Sports in Portugal
 Football in Portugal
 Portugal at the Olympics

Economy and infrastructure of Portugal 

Economy of Portugal
 Economic rank, by nominal GDP (2007): 36th (thirty-sixth)
 Agriculture in Portugal
 Banking in Portugal
 National Bank of Portugal
 Communications in Portugal
 Internet in Portugal
 Companies of Portugal
Currency of Portugal: Euro (see also: Euro topics)
ISO 4217: EUR
 Economic history of Portugal
 Energy in Portugal
 Energy policy of Portugal
 Oil industry in Portugal
 Health care in Portugal
 Mining in Portugal
 Portugal Stock Exchange
 Tourism in Portugal
 Transport in Portugal
 Airports in Portugal
 Rail transport in Portugal
 Roads in Portugal
 Water supply and sanitation in Portugal

Education in Portugal 

Education in Portugal
List of higher education institutions in Portugal
List of schools in Portugal

Health in Portugal 

Health in Portugal

See also 

Portugal
Index of Portugal-related articles
List of international rankings
List of Portugal-related topics
Member state of the European Union
Member state of the North Atlantic Treaty Organization
Member state of the United Nations
Outline of Europe
Outline of geography

References

External links 

 Official Portuguese Government website
  Official Parliament website
 Official Travel and Tourism office website

 Portugal in Photography 2007
 Portugal. The World Factbook. Central Intelligence Agency.
 Official Portuguese Government Travel/media website
 Luso.tv - View Portugal in Video/media website

Portugal
 1